Mary Golda Ross (August 9, 1908 – April 29, 2008) was the first known Native American female engineer, and the first female engineer in the history of Lockheed. She was one of the 40 founding engineers of the renowned and highly secretive Skunk Works project at Lockheed Corporation. She worked at Lockheed from 1942 until her retirement in 1973, where she was best remembered for her work on aerospace design – including the Agena Rocket program – as well as numerous "design concepts for interplanetary space travel, crewed and uncrewed Earth-orbiting flights, the earliest studies of orbiting satellites for both defense and civilian purposes." In 2018, she was chosen to be depicted on the 2019 Native American $1 Coin by the U.S. Mint celebrating Native Americans in the space program.

Early life and education 
Mary G. Ross was born in the small town of Park Hill, Oklahoma, the second of five children of William Wallace Ross Jr and Mary Henrietta Moore Ross. She was the great-granddaughter of the Cherokee Chief John Ross. A talented child, she was sent to live with her grandparents in the Cherokee Nation capital of Tahlequah to attend primary and secondary school.

When she was 16, Ross enrolled in Northeastern State Teachers' College in Tahlequah. She earned a bachelor's degree in mathematics in 1928, at age 20.

She received her master's degree from the Colorado State Teachers College in Greeley in 1938, taking "every astronomy class they had."

Career 
Ross taught math and science in rural Oklahoma schools for nine years, mostly during the Great Depression.

At age 28, she took the civil service examination to work for the Bureau of Indian Affairs (BIA) in Washington, D.C., as a statistical clerk. In 1937, she was reassigned as an advisor to girls at the Santa Fe Indian School, an American Indian boarding school in Santa Fe, New Mexico. In August 1938 she completed requirements for her master's degree from Colorado State College of Education at Greeley; she had attended classes in summers while she was a teacher. She took astronomy classes there in addition to reading extensively in her chosen field of mathematics.

She moved to California in 1941 to seek work after the US joined World War II, on the advice of her father.

Ross was hired as a mathematician by Lockheed in 1942. While there she began working on the effects of pressure on the Lockheed P-38 Lightning. Ross helped to solve numerous design issues involved with high speed flight and issues of aeroelasticity. Although Ross preferred working on topics surrounding interplanetary spaceflight, she later said that "If I had mentioned it in 1942, my credibility would have been questioned."

"Often at night there were four of us working until 11 p.m.," she recalled later. "I was the pencil pusher, doing a lot of research. My state of the art tools were a slide rule and a Friden computer."

After the war, Lockheed sent her to UCLA for a professional certification in engineering. "She studied mathematics for modern engineering, aeronautics and missile and celestial mechanics." It was unusual for a company that hired a woman for work during the war to keep that woman once the war ended; "Gold" Ross continued to work for Lockheed.

In 1952, she joined Lockheed's Advanced Development Program at the then-secret Skunk Works, where she worked on "preliminary design concepts for interplanetary space travel, crewed and uncrewed earth-orbiting flights, the earliest studies of orbiting satellites for both defense and civilian purposes." She worked on the Agena rocket project, and on preliminary design concepts for flyby missions to Venus and Mars.
Most of the theories and papers that emerged from the group, including those by Ross, are still classified. As she told her alma mater's newspaper in the 1990s, "We were taking the theoretical and making it real." One of Ross' seminal roles was as one of the authors of the NASA Planetary Flight Handbook Vol. III, about space travel to Mars and Venus ...
"She was just one of the guys," said Norbert Hill, who met Ross when he was executive director of the American Indian Science and Engineering Society. "She was as smart as the rest of them and she held her own."

In 1958, she appeared on the television show What's My Line?. It took some time for the contestants to guess that she was the person who "Designs Rocket Missiles and Satellites (Lockheed Aircraft)."

Ross became a senior advanced systems staff engineer by the late 1960s, working on the Polaris reentry vehicle, Poseidon and Trident missiles.

Later life 
 
After retiring in 1973, Ross lived in Los Altos, California, and worked to recruit young women and Native American youth into engineering careers. Since the 1950s, she had been a member of the Society of Women Engineers. She also supported the American Indians in Science and Engineering Society (AISES) and the Council of Energy Resource Tribes.

At age 96, wearing her "first traditional Cherokee dress" of green calico, made by her niece, she participated in the opening ceremonies of the National Museum of the American Indian in Washington, D.C. Upon her death in 2008, she left a $400,000 endowment to that museum.

Awards and recognition 
 Silicon Valley Engineering Council’s Hall of Fame, 1992
 Peninsula Woman of the Year, by the women's communications society Theta Sigma Phi
 Achievement awards from the American Indian Science and Engineering Society and from the Council of Energy Resource Tribes
 The San Francisco Examiner's Award for Woman of Distinction, 1961
 Woman of Achievement Award, California State Federation of Business and Professional Clubs, 1961
 Outstanding alumna awards from her first two alma maters
 Fellow and life member of the Society of Women Engineers.
 In 1992, The Santa Clara Valley Section established a scholarship in her name.
 Google Doodle on August 9, 2018
Ross is pictured on the reverse of the 2019 Sacagawea Dollar.

See also
 Timeline of women in science

References

External links
https://www.nps.gov/people/mary-g-ross.htm 
 Mary Ross on "What's my line", CBS, Jun 22, 1958

20th-century American engineers
20th-century American mathematicians
20th-century Native Americans
20th-century American philanthropists
20th-century women engineers
20th-century women mathematicians
Women aerospace engineers
American aerospace engineers
American women engineers
American women mathematicians
American women philanthropists
Cherokee Nation businesspeople
Engineers from California
Engineers from Oklahoma
Lockheed people
Mathematicians from California
Mathematicians from Oklahoma
Native American engineers
Northeastern State University alumni
People from Cherokee County, Oklahoma
People from Los Altos, California
Philanthropists from California
Philanthropists from Oklahoma
University of California, Los Angeles alumni
University of Northern Colorado alumni
20th-century American women
20th-century Native American women
21st-century Native Americans
21st-century Native American women
1908 births
2008 deaths
Native American women scientists
20th-century women philanthropists